James E. Carnes was a member of the Ohio Senate from 1995 to 2004 representing the 20th District, which encompasses much of Southeastern Ohio.  He was succeeded by Joy Padgett, who was appointed to fill out the remainder of his term upon his resignation in 2004.

References

External links

Republican Party Ohio state senators
Living people
21st-century American politicians
Year of birth missing (living people)